Water race may refer to:

Aqueduct (water supply), a watercourse constructed to convey water
Boat racing, a race carried out by driving boats on water
Swimming (sport), a race carried out by swimming through water

See also
Mill race, a current of water that turns a water wheel